CBS Kilkenny is a Roman Catholic school located in Kilkenny, Ireland. It has a sporting tradition in hurling, but also fields teams in rugby and basketball. It is located on James' Street in Kilkenny.

The school was founded in 1860 by the Congregation of Christian Brothers for a sum of £3000. is very influential in the Kilkenny community and sets an example for the other schools in Kilkenny.

History
The Irish Christian Brothers came to Kilkenny in 1860. Five years before this a meeting was held between the Chairmanship of the Lord Mayor as requested by the then Bishop of Ossory. The assembly decided to raise funds to build the school and invited the Christian Brothers, led by Edmund Ignatius Rice to aid the cause. A fund of some £3,000 was collected and invested for the purpose. It was agreed that the brothers would be sent to Kilkenny and be provided with furnished accommodation free of charge. The voluntary fee for pupils was levied at one pence, this money would be used only in the maintenance of the school. In 1860 a site was bought and a large building erected. The main part of this development still remains in full use up to this day and functions as the entrance to the newer highly renovated parts of the school. On 26 September 1860, it opened its doors to a large number of pupils; 260 boys were placed on the roll that day but many had to be excluded due to lack of space.

As of 2014, the school had over 660 pupils enrolled.

References

External links 
CBS Kilkenny's website

1860 establishments in Ireland
Secondary schools in County Kilkenny
Boys' schools in the Republic of Ireland
Educational institutions established in 1860
Congregation of Christian Brothers secondary schools in the Republic of Ireland